University College was established in 1868 in Mangalore city of Karnataka in India. The campus is situated on an eight-acre land at Hampankatta in Mangalore. This college became a constituent college of Mangalore University on 7 March 1993. It is among the 19 colleges chosen by the University Grants Commission (UGC) for 'heritage status' across the country.

Alumni  
Notable alumni from this college include 
 K. Shivaram Karanth 
 Kamaladevi Chattopadhyay 
 Veerappa Moily 
 Ramanath Rai 
 M. V. Kamath 
 P. M. Sayeed 
 K. Suryanarayana Adiga 
 Panje Mangesh Rao 
 M. Govinda Pai

References

Colleges of Mangalore University
Universities and colleges in Mangalore
Educational institutions established in 1868
1868 establishments in India
Academic institutions formerly affiliated with the University of Madras